The Cybils Awards, or Children's and Young Adult Bloggers' Literary Awards, are a set of annual book awards given by people who blog about children's and young-adult books. Co-founded by Kelly Herold and Anne Boles Levy in 2006, the awards were created to address an apparent gap between  perceived as too elitist and other awards that did not seem selective enough.

Books are nominated by the public in ten genres of children's and young adult literature: Book Apps, Easy Readers & Short Chapter Books, Fantasy & Science Fiction, Fiction Picture Books, Graphic Novels, Middle Grade Novels, Non-Fiction Middle Grade/Young Adult Books, Non-Fiction Picture Books, Poetry, and Young Adult Novels. Nominees go through two rounds of panel-based judging before a winner is announced in each category. Finalists and winners are selected on the basis of literary merit and kid appeal.

Panelists are volunteers and must be active bloggers with extensive experience in children's or young adult literature, either as readers and enthusiasts or as authors, librarians, booksellers, teachers, or others with verifiable investment in the world of children's literature.

Criteria 
 Anybody may nominate a children's or young adult book published October 16 of the preceding year - October 15 of the contest year.
 Books must be written in English or they may be bilingual.
 Only one book may be nominated per person, per category.
 Nominations open October 1 and close October 15 of the contest year.
 Books should exemplify award criteria of literary merit and "kid appeal".

Recipients

2006 Cybils Award winners

2007 Cybils Award winners

2008 Cybils Award winners

2009 Cybils Award winners

2010 Cybils Award winners

2011 Cybils Award winners

2012 Cybils Award winners

2013 Cybils Award winners

References

External links
 
 Iowa Independent: Grassroots Kid-Lit Award Faces New Challenges
 Bloggers' Kid Lit Awards Unveil Top Picks

American children's literary awards
Awards established in 2006
2006 establishments in the United States